Nagahata (written: 長畑 or 永畑) is a Japanese surname. Notable people with the surname include:

, Japanese swimmer
, Japanese footballer

Japanese-language surnames